is a Japanese manga series written by Akira Itō, based on Kazuki Takahashi's Yu-Gi-Oh! manga. The series, which is a spin-off side story to the original manga, was serialized in Shueisha's V Jump magazine between April 2004 and December 2007, and was published in North America by Viz Media.

Plot

Yu-Gi-Oh R takes place following Yugi Mutou's victory in the Battle City tournament. Yako Tenma, the protégé' and adopted son of Maximillion Pegasus, decides to avenge his teacher's defeat at the hands of Yugi, believing him to be responsible for Pegasus' alleged death. After taking over KaibaCorp while Seto Kaiba is in the United States, Tenma kidnaps Anzu Mazaki, prompting Yugi and his friend Katsuya Jonouchi to face Tenma's RA Project and the duel professors. Seto Kaiba and his brother Mokuba also come to the scene to rescue the company.

Characters
Many of the characters that are exclusive to Yu-Gi-Oh! R have names that are also Intel codenames. Intel codenames in turn are frequently taken from names of cities and towns near Intel factories in Oregon, Washington, and other locations.
 - The kōhai (protégé) and adopted son (often mistaken, or mistranslated as younger brother) of Maximillion Pegasus (Pegasus J. Crawford in the Japanese version) who wants revenge for Pegasus' defeat.
 - The first professor. Yugi defeats him. He is named after the Deschutes River and Deschutes County, Oregon. "Deschutes" is also a pre-release codename for the 333 MHz P6 Intel Pentium II chip.
 - The second professor, who plays a vampire-themed deck. Yugi defeats her. She is named after Tillamook, Oregon. "Tillamook" is also a pre-release codename for the Embedded 266 MHz Intel Pentium MMX chip.
 - The third professor, who has such bad luck. Jonouchi defeats him. He is named after Klamath Falls, Oregon. "Klamath" is also a pre-release codename for the 300 MHz Intel Pentium II chip.
 - The fourth professor, who plays a machine-themed deck. Yugi defeats him. "Dixon" is also a pre-release codename for the 333 MHz 1.6V Intel Pentium II chip. His key card Commander Covington (督戦官コヴィントン Tokusenkan Covinton) originates from "Covington" codenamed for the 266 MHz P6 Intel Pentium II chip.
 - The fifth professor, who plays a mutant-themed deck. Jonouchi defeats him. He is named after the Coppermine River in Oregon. The name of that river was used as a codename for the 866 MHz Flip Chip Pin Grid Array (FCPGA) Pentium III (P3-850) microprocessor, which was released by Intel.
 a.k.a.  - The sixth professor, who is an old woman in a wheelchair that plays a forest-themed deck. Yugi defeats her. "Maico" is an alternate romanization of the name "Maiko", but it also refers to a brand of motorcycle. Kato Engineering is a company associated with motorcycles. The name also originates from the "KatMai" chip.
 - Yako Tenma's older brother (although only slightly older, since they are identical twins). Gekko wants to stop the RA project. He uses an elf deck. "Gekko" is the name of the microprocessor chip in the Nintendo GameCube.
 - Mendo, the seventh professor, uses an insect deck. Jonouchi defeats him. "Mendocino" is also a pre-release codename for the 300 MHz P6 Intel Pentium II Centrino chip.
 - Willa, the eighth professor, plays a White Horns Dragon deck. Kaiba defeats him. Willamette is a river in Oregon and a codename for Intel's 1.5 GHz P7 Pentium IV.
 - Tedd, the ninth professor, duels Gekko. Gekko defeats Tedd. Uses a Beast Deck. Banias is the codename for Intel's first x86 Pentium M chip.
 - Reiko, the tenth professor, duels Jonouchi. Jonouchi defeats Reiko. Uses a Chess/Deck Destruction Deck. Kitamori means northwood in Japanese. Northwood was the codename for the 130 nm version of Intel's Pentium 4 microprocessor.
 - Scott is the eleventh professor, and another of Pegasus' adopted sons. Yugi defeats Depre. He duels against Yugi using a Universe Deck. Prescott was the codename for the 90 nm version of Intel's Pentium 4 microprocessor.
 - Richie is the twelfth professor, and another of Pegasus' adopted sons. He duels Gekkou and wins. Merced was the codename for Itanium, an IA-64 microprocessor developed jointly by Intel and Hewlett-Packard.
 - Cedar is the thirteenth professor and, although he is not actually named in the actual manga, dispatched almost offhandedly in a single panel by Yugi's Osiris the Heaven Dragon (Slifer the Sky Dragon in the English version), Cedar is identified in a sketch in the 4th volume of the collected manga. Cedar Mill was the codename for the 65 nm version of Intel's Pentium 4 microprocessor. It is also a play on "Cedar Mills", which is an area in Beaverton, Oregon.
 - Appears in a special chapter of Yu-Gi-Oh! R. Momono tries to take over the Kame Game Shop owned by Sugoroku Mutou. His key card  originates from "Tualatin" codename for the 1.266 GHz Flip Chip Pin Grid Array (FCPGA2) Pentium III (P3-850) microprocessor, which was released by Intel.

Volumes
The series was collected in five volumes released from March 4, 2005 to April 4, 2008. The first volume from Yu-Gi-Oh! R was released on October 6, 2009 by Viz.

References

Adventure anime and manga
2004 manga
Science fiction anime and manga
Yu-Gi-Oh!
Viz Media manga